The Cooperative Alliance for Seacoast Transportation (COAST) is the primary provider of mass transportation for the Seacoast region of New Hampshire, as well as parts of southern Maine. COAST is a non-profit agency founded in 1981 to provide public transportation options in southeastern New Hampshire. First established solely as a private contractor to previously existing bus lines, COAST now runs its own set of public transit routes and transports almost 500,000 passengers per year.

Fleet 
COAST operates a fleet of 37 vehicles, including standard transit buses, trolley replicas, cutaway vans, and accessible minivans as part of its regular service. COAST's operating fleet consists of the following (as of 2013):

Transit buses
 Three 2001 Gillig Low Floor buses (30')
 Four 2008 Gillig Low Floor buses (40')
 Five 2011 Gillig Low Floor buses (35'), including three trolley replicas
 Six 2012 Gillig Low Floor buses (29' & 35'), including two trolley replicas
 Five 1995 New Flyer Industries D40LF buses, purchased used in 2012 from Orange County Transportation

Vans
 Six accessible minivans (2009, 2010, 2012, 2013) for ADA paratransit service
 Four Ford 14-passenger cutaway vans (2006, 2007, 2010)

Fixed-route system

Year-round services

Regional routes 
COAST's four regional routes, particularly routes 1 and 2, have historically been the backbone of its transit operations.

Local routes 
COAST currently operates three "local routes", one in the city of Dover and two in the city of Portsmouth. Route 33 provides local service to Sixth Street and the Strafford County Complex in Dover, while Routes 40 and 41 constitute the trolley routes serving downtown Portsmouth and Pease International Tradeport.

Clipper Connection (Commuter express routes)
The Clipper Connection is the colloquial term for COAST's commuter express routes, which were launched in 2012. The Clipper Connection routes are intended to provide express connections for commuters to the Portsmouth Naval Shipyard (PNSY) in Kittery, Maine, Pease Tradeport, and downtown Portsmouth.

COAST currently operates three routes providing service to the communities of Dover, Rochester, and Somersworth in New Hampshire, as well as Berwick, South Berwick and Eliot in Maine. COAST also extends two runs of Route 41 to provide service between PNSY and Portsmouth. A late-afternoon run servicing Dover and Rochester, originally numbered 102, was cancelled due to low ridership and re-established as an extension of Route 2 instead.

References
COAST official website

Bus transportation in New Hampshire
Bus transportation in Maine
Transportation in Strafford County, New Hampshire
Transportation in Rockingham County, New Hampshire